Mefitis was the Samnite goddess of the foul-smelling gases of the earth,  worshipped in central and southern Italy since before Roman times, with her main shrine at the volcano Ampsanctus in Samnium. There was a temple dedicated to her in Cremona, and another on the Esquiline Hill in Rome. It is theorized that Mefitis was originally a goddess of underground sources, such as natural springs—the fact that many of these springs were sulfurous led to her association with noxious gases. She is almost always identified with volcanoes, having been worshipped at Pompeii. Her name, which likely means "one who smokes in the middle", is also seen as Mephitis.

Overview
In Roman mythology, Mefitis (or Mephitis; Mefite in Italian) was a minor goddess of the poisonous gases emitted from the ground in swamps and volcanic vapors.

Foul-smelling geological fissures connected to the divinity (see below) are located in Italy along the Via Appia between Rome and Brindisi.  There, the ancient Romans would rest on their travels and pay homage to the goddess by performing animal sacrifices using the fissure's deadly gases.  Today, it lies near the village of Rocca San Felice in the province of Avellino (Campania region).

Virgil describes this sanctuary in the Aeneid:

Varro mentions a Grove of Mefitis on the Esquiline.

Etymology and derivatives
The etymology of the name Mefitis is controversial, but according to the Italian linguist Alberto Manco, the system of the epithets that identified the goddess from place to place would prove her relationship with a water-based dimension.

"Mephitic", derived from Mefitis, is now an adjective in the English language meaning "offensive in odour"; "noxious"; and "poisonous". In Italian, a mefite is also a solfatara or fumarole (i.e., a gaseous fissure). 

The name of the family of animals Mephitidae (mephitids, or skunks and their kin) and of the genus Mephitis (skunks of North and Central America) are both related to mephitic, so named for the noxious secretions of their scent glands.

See also
Avernus
Mefite of Rocca San Felice

References

Further reading
 Lucernoni, Maria Federica Petraccia. "Mefitis: "dea salutifera"?" In: Gerión Vol. 32, Nº 32, 2014, págs. 181-198. . 
 Szylińczuk, Agata. "The cult of the goddess Mefitis in light of literary and epigraphic sources". In: Graeco-Latina Brunensia. 2022, vol. 27, iss. 1, pp. 107-117. ; ; DOI: 10.5817/GLB2022-1-8

Roman goddesses
Personifications in Roman mythology
Earth goddesses